Aryan Cargo Express was a cargo airline based in New Delhi, India. 
It operated a single Airbus A310-300F. Plans for the introduction of an MD-11F did not materialize. In December 2010 the only aircraft of the airline was stored at Mumbai International Airport and the airline had ceased operations.

Destinations

Brussels - Brussels Airport

Hong Kong - Hong Kong International Airport

Mumbai - Indira Gandhi International Airport Hub

Seoul - Incheon International Airport

Bangkok - Suvarnabhumi Airport

Fleet

Aryan Cargo Express operated the following aircraft (as of December 2010):

See also
List of defunct airlines of India

References

Defunct airlines of India
Airlines established in 2005
Airlines disestablished in 2010
Indian companies disestablished in 2010
Indian companies established in 2005
Companies based in Delhi
2005 establishments in Delhi